Lisa Leitner (born 3 April 1995) is an Austrian slalom canoeist who has competed at the international level since 2010.

She won two silver medals in the K1 team event at the ICF Canoe Slalom World Championships, earning them in 2014 and 2017. She also won a silver medal in the same event at the 2018 European Championships in Prague.

Her younger brother Mario is also a slalom canoeist.

World Cup individual podiums

References

External links
 

Austrian female canoeists
Living people
1995 births
Medalists at the ICF Canoe Slalom World Championships